"Getting Out of Hand" is the debut single by American female band The Bangles, released in 1981 and produced by the band themselves.

The group was named at the time The Bangs, and its line-up consisted of Susanna Hoffs, Debbi Peterson and Vicki Peterson. The group was part of the Paisley Underground movement, a musical scene based around Los Angeles in which groups mixed 1960s-inspired pop with garage rock.

"Getting Out of Hand", written by Vicki Peterson and sung by Hoffs, was released as The Bangs' debut single on their own label DownKiddie Records, and distributed locally around Los Angeles in 1981. In order to gain more exposure, Hoffs personally handed a copy of the single to radio DJ Rodney Bingenheimer, pleading for the song to be aired on his radio show Rodney on the ROQ. In December 1981, Bingenheimer started playing the single, resulting in an increase of the audience on the band's live shows. The Bangles would later contribute an instrumental song, "Bitchen Summer", to the Rodney On The Roq: Volume 3 compilation issued in 1982.

In early 1982, The Bangs had to rename themselves Bangles after a New Jersey band of the same name threatened to sue the band. Accordingly, the single was reissued (again on the DownKiddie label) with the name change, with the subtitle "formerly The Bang's" on the cover. A group photograph on the back of this reissued single showed Bangles' bass player Annette Zilinskas, who had joined the band at the time, although she didn't play on the record.

The b-side, "Call On Me", was co-written by Hoffs, Vicki Peterson, and David Roback, a friend of Hoffs' brother and lead singer of fellow Paisley Underground band Rain Parade.

In 1982, while the group was still known as The Bangs, "Getting Out of Hand" was rewritten with new lyrics but with the same musical structure, for a short radio commercial for an underground L.A. magazine named NO MAG, announcing a new issue of the magazine. The repurposed song (named "NO MAG Commercial") was later released on the 1983 compilation The Radio Tokyo Tapes.

"Getting Out of Hand" was not a success and did not hit the charts, but it did gain the attention of music executive Miles Copeland, who signed the band to his label Faulty Products. The Bangles then released the EP Bangles in 1982, although neither "Getting out of Hand" nor "Call On Me" was included on the record.

"Getting Out of Hand" and "Call On Me" were never included on any Bangles album (until they were collected on the 2014 compilation of early material, Ladies and Gentlemen...The Bangles!), and with the band shifting their sound as the '80's progressed, the record fell into relative obscurity. In 2003 however, The Bangles resurrected both songs and released them for the first time on CD in remastered form as b-sides to their new singles, the former as a b-side to their "Something That You Said" single and the latter on the "Tear Off Your Own Head (It's A Doll Revolution)" single. Both were included on the Japanese edition of their Doll Revolution album as bonus tracks.

Track listing
 "Getting Out of Hand" – 2:15
 "Call On Me" – 1:31

References

1981 debut singles
The Bangles songs
1981 songs